The 1995 Asian Basketball Confederation Championship for Men were held in Seoul, South Korea.

Preliminary round

Group A

Group B

Group C

Group D

Quarterfinal round

Group I

Group II

Group III

Group IV

Classification 17th–19th

Classification 5th–16th

15th place

13th place

11th place

9th place

7th place

5th place

Final round

Semifinals

3rd place

Final

Final standing

Awards

Most Valuable Player:  Hur Jae
Best Scorer:  Hur Jae
Best 3-Pointer:  Yung Kam Wah
Sportsmanship Award:  Oleg Melechtchenko

References

External links
 Todor66.com, Results
 Archive.fiba.com

ABC
1995
Basketball 1995
B
June 1995 sports events in Asia